is a Japanese mixed martial artist and wrestler. A professional competitor since 2009, he has fought in the UFC, Bellator, Pancrase and King of the Cage.

Background
Born and raised in Japan, Anzai began wrestling in high school at the age of 15. Anzai later continued wrestling at Meiji University, and also attended Kokugakuin University. In amateur wrestling, Anzai was second place at the 2005 All-Japan Junior Olympic Cup, was first place at the 2008 All-Japan Combat Wrestling Championship (over 80 kg). Anzai also won the ADCC Asia Trials in 2011 at 99 kg and 2013 at 88 kg, respectively.

Mixed martial arts career

Early career
Anzai made his professional MMA debut in May 2009. He fought exclusively in his native Japan for the Pancrase and King of the Cage (Japan) promotions. During the next six years he amassed a record of 8–1.

Ultimate Fighting Championship
In his UFC debut, Anzai stepped in to replace Sheldon Westcott against Alberto Mina on August 23, 2014, at UFC Fight Night 48. He lost the fight via TKO in the first round.

In his second fight for the promotion, Anzai faced Roger Zapata	on September 26, 2015, at UFC Fight Night: Barnett vs. Nelson. He won the fight via TKO due to a hand injury Zapata sustained in the third round.

After nearly two years away from the promotion, Anzai returned to face Luke Jumeau on September 23, 2017, at UFC Fight Night: Saint Preux vs. Okami. He won the fight by unanimous decision.

Anzai faced Jake Matthews on June 23, 2018, at UFC Fight Night 132. He lost the fight via rear-naked choke in the first round.

Anzai was released from the UFC in June 2019.

Post-UFC career
After the his release from the UFC, Anzai won one fight in his native Deep promotion before signing with the Bellator. He made his promotional debut against Michael Page at Bellator & Rizin: Japan on December 29, 2019. He lost the fight via knockout in the second round.

Championships and achievements
 Pancrase
Middleweight King of Pancrase (One time)

Mixed martial arts record

|-
|Loss
|align=center|11–4
|Michael Page
|KO (punch)
|Bellator & Rizin: Japan
|
|align=center|2
|align=center|0:23
|Saitama, Japan
|
|-
|Win
|align=center| 11–3
|Yoichiro Sato
|Technical Decision (majority)
|DEEP 91 Impact
|
|align=center| 2
|align=center| 0:39
|Tokyo, Japan
|
|-
|Loss
|align=center|10–3
|Jake Matthews
|Submission (rear-naked choke)
|UFC Fight Night: Cowboy vs. Edwards
|
|align=center|1
|align=center|3:44
|Kallang, Singapore
|
|-
|Win
|align=center|10–2
|Luke Jumeau
|Decision (unanimous)
|UFC Fight Night: Saint Preux vs. Okami 
|
|align=center|3
|align=center|5:00
|Saitama, Japan
|
|-
|Win
|align=center|9–2
|Roger Zapata
|TKO (hand injury)
|UFC Fight Night: Barnett vs. Nelson
|
|align=center|3
|align=center|0:47
|Saitama, Japan
|
|-
|Loss
|align=center|8–2
|Alberto Mina
|TKO (punches)
|UFC Fight Night: Bisping vs. Le
|
|align=center|1
|align=center|4:17
|Macau, SAR, China
|
|-
|Win
|align=center|8–1
|Ryo Kawamura
|TKO (punches)
|Pancrase 259
|
|align=center|1
|align=center|2:52
|Tokyo, Japan
|
|-
|Win
|align=center|7–1
|Will Noland
|TKO (punches)
|Pancrase 252: 20th Anniversary
|
|align=center|1
|align=center|2:30
|Yokohama, Japan
|
|-
|Win
|align=center| 6–1
|Yuji Hisamatsu
|Decision (unanimous)
|Pancrase 247
|
|align=center|2
|align=center|5:00
|Tokyo, Japan
|
|-
|Win
|align=center| 5–1
|Hyun Gwan Lee
|TKO (soccer kick)
|Pancrase: Progress Tour 12: All Eyes on Yuki Kondo
|
|align=center| 1
|align=center| 4:36
|Tokyo, Japan
|
|-
|Win
|align=center| 4–1
|Yuji Sakuragi
|Decision (Unanimous)
|Pancrase: Progress Tour 3
|
|align=center| 2
|align=center| 5:00
|Tokyo, Japan
|
|-
|Win
|align=center| 3–1
|Akihito Tanaka
|TKO (punches)
|Pancrase: Impressive Tour 8
|
|align=center| 1
|align=center| 4:16
|Tokyo, Japan
|
|-
|Loss
|align=center| 2–1
|Jerry Nelson
|Decision
|KOTC: Toryumon
|
|align=center|3
|align=center|3:00
|Tokyo, Japan
|
|-
|Win
|align=center| 2–0
|Yuji Saeki
|TKO (punches)
|KOTC: Toryumon
|
|align=center|1
|align=center|4:54
|Tokyo, Japan
|
|-
|Win
|align=center| 1–0
|Jason Symak 
|TKO (punches)
|Pancrase Gate 2009
|
|align=center|1
|align=center|1:35
|Tokyo, Japan
|
|-

References

External links
 
 

1985 births
Living people
Japanese male mixed martial artists
Mixed martial artists utilizing Greco-Roman wrestling
Japanese male sport wrestlers
Amateur wrestlers
Ultimate Fighting Championship male fighters
Sportspeople from Saitama (city)